Pawan Kumar Gupta is an India politician. Gupta is a member of the Jammu and Kashmir Legislative Assembly from the Udhampur constituency in Udhampur district as an Independent candidate.

References 

Bharatiya Janata Party politicians from Jammu and Kashmir
Independent politicians in India
Living people
Jammu and Kashmir MLAs 2014–2018
Year of birth missing (living people)